Joseph Shafer Farm, also known as Shady Lawn Farm and Maple Lawn Farm, is a historic home and farm located in Springfield Township, Franklin County, Indiana.  The house was built in 1883, and is a two-story, Italianate style brick dwelling.  It has a slate roof and features a pair of two-story, three-window, projecting bays.  Also on the property are two contributing barns (c. 1883), privy, smithy, henhouse, garage, granary, and well house.

It was listed on the National Register of Historic Places in 1982.

References

Farms on the National Register of Historic Places in Indiana
Italianate architecture in Indiana
Houses completed in 1883
Buildings and structures in Franklin County, Indiana
National Register of Historic Places in Franklin County, Indiana